Harvey Beaks is an American animated television series created by C. H. Greenblatt for Nickelodeon. The series aired from March 28, 2015, until December 9, 2016, when it was moved to Nicktoons on March 1, 2017, which followed the series finale on December 29, 2017.

Plot
The series is about a little boy named Harvey, who is a friendly bird, and his two best friends, the imp twins Fee and Foo, and their lives together as they grow and have adventures.

Together, the trio seek adventure and mischief in their home Littlebark Grove.

Episodes

Characters

Main
  Harvey (voiced by Max Charles) is a kind-hearted, mild-mannered 10-year-old anthropomorphic bird with some OCD problems and troubles coming out of his comfort zone. However, his best friends help him throughout the show.
 Fee (voiced by Angelina Wahler) is Harvey's best friend and Foo's twin sister – She is a 10-year-old imp. She is protective of the ones she loves and tries to be the best sister she can.
  Foo (voiced by Jackson Brundage and Tom Robinson) is Harvey's other best friend, Fee's twin brother, and 10-year-old imp. He and his sister appear to be homeless, spending every night in a tree and taking care of themselves.
 Michelle Beaks (voiced by Kari Wahlgren) – The Beaks' baby daughter, whom Irving often carried around in season 1 while she was still an egg, though Harvey treated her as a baby sister even then. She hatched in episode "The New Bugaboo", demonstrating a mischievous, rambunctious, and trouble-making personality opposite to Harvey's.
 Miriam Beaks (voiced by Kerri Kenney-Silver) – Harvey's mother. She works as a librarian, but was notorious in her youth for her wild, partying, and rebellious nature.
 Irving Beaks (voiced by Scott Adsit (series) and Chris Parnell (pilot)) – Harvey's bespectacled father. He is very shy and sensitive, preferring to remain at home, where he can take care of the kids.

Recurring
 Children
 Dade (voiced by C. H. Greenblatt), a chubby-cheeked rabbit with an abhorrence for Fee and Foo's antics – As Harvey's closest friend before Harvey met Fee and Foo, Dade is very extremely obsessed with Harvey and often expresses a conservative attitude. He is the oldest of his many brothers and sisters.
 Claire (voiced by Nicole Wedel) – She is a timid fox with glasses, has a crush on Foo, and likes to draw anime-inspired art featuring herself with Foo. She has an older sister who is never seen, and outdoes Claire in everything. Because of this, Claire's mother constantly pressures her to be as successful as her sister, and it stresses her out.
 Princess Roberts (voiced by Andres Salaff), an obnoxious owl who wears a pink dress and a tiara  – She is bad-tempered, selfish and extremely spoiled, believing herself to be the most perfect person in the world. Her father is Doctor Roberts, who constantly showers her with praise and gifts, but otherwise pays very little attention to her.
 "Technobear" Snapper (voiced by Mason Vaughn), a street-smart brown bear in a red speedo – As his nickname suggests, he is a fan of techno music, who enjoys partying at nightclubs and trying to impress women. "Terrybear" - as is revealed in an episode of the same name - is his real name; he is adopted by a pair of turtles.
 Kratz (voiced by Matthew Zhang), a depressed and neurotic skunk – He wears brown pants pulled up to his waist and seems to have terrible luck, and sprays gas when he is scared or nervous. He has secret talent for drawing that surprises the characters in the show.
 Rooter Wellington (voiced by Laz Meiman (season 1) and Addie Chandler (season 2)) – He is a strong and tough wild boar, with a large mohawk and an Australian accent. Rooter has much experience in surviving in the wild, and prefers to do what is most challenging and refreshing. His father is a mailman  and dedicated survivalist.
 Piri Piri (voiced by Madeleine Curry) – A yellow bird, and Claire's best friend. She is an extremely idealistic artist and daydreamer, who gets her inspirations from her dreams and sees good in everything. She is revealed to have a crush on Harvey in episode Secret Gordon. Her mother is a fortune teller named Hanzi.
 Mikey (voiced by Nicholas Sumida) – A soft-voiced frog, a friend of Harvey, who wears headphones.
 Kathy (also voiced by Nicholas Sumida) – A brown-furred, capybara who wears a pink bow, is very shy, and has a fondness for leaves. She has a Web Video Channel where she shares her love of leaves with others.

 Adults
 Doctor Roberts (voiced by Matt Berry in "The Spitting Tree" and "Princess is Better Than You" and Jeff Bennett in all other appearances) – An owl who is Princess' friendly but eccentric father, as well as one of Irving's friends. He has a weird obsession with healing crystals, and in his free time, he likes to meditate. He has a very high opinion of his daughter, yet rarely spends time with her.
 The Spirit of Wetbark Lake (voiced by Dwight Schultz) – An enormous, blue, snake-like water spirit that lives in Wetbark Lake, where he tries to keep the lake a nice place to have fun and has no tolerance for any bad behavior. He is promoted to an ocean spirit in season 2's "Ocean Promotion", forcing him to leave Littlebark Grove for the sea, and a different lake spirit replaces him for the remainder of the series.
 Jeremy (voiced by C. H. Greenblatt) – A big, furry mushroom-like creature with a large nose and a squeaky voice who works as a bartender at a nightclub. As a close friend of the Beaks family, he often babysits Harvey and Michelle:. It is revealed in "Jeremy, Defender of the Forest" that he is, in fact, the guardian of Littlebark Grove, having retired centuries ago.
 Randl (voiced by Marc Maron) – A grouchy and dishonest raccoon who runs a rental store named Randl's Rentls. He lives with and constantly argues with his senile, overbearing mother Meryl (voiced by Nicholas Sumida).
 Moff Williamson (voiced by Dave Foley) – A wingless, purple moth obsessed with Steampunk culture. He is a very close friend of Irving but is often lonely as Irving now spends more time with his family and because nobody else in Littlebark Grove shares his interests.
 Bartleburt (voiced by Fred Stoller) – A mild-mannered (if somewhat dull) tree spirit who works with Miriam at the library. He lives with his wife Carol in a section of Littlebark Grove populated by others of his kind: Sectityorest.
 Tara (voiced by Ana Gasteyer) – A giant spider hairdresser who works in a hair salon. She is a friend of Miriam with over three hundred children. She is over-pressured and is a very busy woman.
 Les Squirrels (voiced by André Sogliuzzo (Jean Luc) and C. H. Greenblatt (other squirrels)) — A group of six French squirrels who serve as recurring antagonists (or antiheroes on some occasions) for Harvey and his friends. They are made of Jean Luc, Jean Claude, Sean Jea, Bili Jean, Long Jean, and Papa Jean. With the exception of Jean Luc, all of them speak in a mixture of squirrel chattering and French-like nonsense. They are often angry and seek justice for anything they have happened to them.
 Officer Fredd (voiced by Michael-Leon Wooley) – A large green caterpillar who enforces the law around Littlebark Grove. He is extremely harsh towards the troublemakers and keeps trouble at bay with his special taser gloves, shouting out "bu-zap" every time he electrocutes lawbreakers. His appearance, name, and mannerisms are based on Judge Dredd.
 Curtis "The Inspiration" and Janet "Pooker" Snapper (voiced by Mikey Kelley and Rachel Butera respectively) – Technobear's adoptive parents. They are turtles who both speak with New Jersey accents. Their names are references to Michael Sorrentino and Nicole Polizzi's nicknames from Jersey Shore. Janet is also a friend of Miriam.
 Aiden and Miley (voiced by Jim O'Heir and Catherine O'Hara respectively) - Harvey's maternal grandparents. Aiden is a retired police officer often seen with a camera, which he uses to film family events and making puns. Miley is a retired judge and adores her grandson very dearly.
 Roland Beaks (voiced by Blake Clark) - Harvey's paternal grandfather. In contrast to his son Irving and grandson, he is very quiet and prefers not to show emotion. He wears an eyepatch over his right eye. He learns to open up more because of his son and his grandson.
 Blister (voiced by Ken Jenkins) - He was an agoraphobic elderly mole who lived in a nursing home. He was a mischievous one, like Fee. Fee befriended him in the episode The Blister. He passes away in the episode Later Dingus. He is also Randl's long-lost father.
 Bada and Grada (voiced by C. H. Greenblatt and Maria Bamford) - Fee and Foo's parents which they are imps who appeared in the final episode The End and the Beginning. They have a personality similar to Foo's, and they have been committed to finding their lost children for maybe a decade until finding them, which Fee appreciates very much.

Production
Greenblatt had previously created the show Chowder for Cartoon Network and had started to develop his next project shortly after it ended in 2010. Greenblatt was looking to create a series with a different vibe from Chowder, which was largely absurdist and comical in nature, by telling stories that had more heart and emotional connection with the audience. Greenblatt pitched the idea to Nickelodeon under the title Bad Seeds and an 11-minute pilot was commissioned. Bad Seeds was eventually picked up for a full series in September 2013, but had to change its name halfway through production due to trademark issues. Greenblatt turned to social networking sites such as Tumblr while building the crew of Harvey Beaks, hiring artists who had little to no prior experience working in animation, but were brought on board due to the quality of their personal work.

As with Greenblatt's previous show, Harvey Beaks features child actors providing the voices for the younger characters, with the exception of major characters Dade and Princess Roberts (voiced by C. H. Greenblatt and Andres Salaff respectively). Most of the minor child characters are voiced by adults.

On June 21, 2015, it was confirmed that the show was renewed for a second season, which began nearly a year later on June 13, 2016, with the episode The New Bugaboo.

Cancellation
On November 6, 2016, C. H. Greenblatt announced that the series had been cancelled. Additionally, Greenblatt confirmed that the remaining episodes will air on Nicktoons, which he had not been made aware of until seeing a Twitter post from Nickelodeon. Harvey Beaks was originally set to premiere new episodes on Nicktoons on November 20, 2016. Following a series of angry rants by Greenblatt (which were later deleted), the episodes were delayed. Greenblatt later stated in a Tumblr post the following February, "I literally have no idea when or where or if [the episodes]'ll air." The new episodes eventually started airing on Nicktoons on March 1, 2017. The last episode aired on Nicktoons on December 29, 2017. After the finale of Harvey Beaks, Greenblatt would later move to Warner Bros. Animation, developing Jellystone! for HBO Max and Cartoon Network.

Music
All of the music in Harvey Beaks is composed by Ego Plum. It is also played by a 40-piece orchestra. The theme song was performed by Plum, Steve Bartek, Bob Mothersbaugh and David J.

Broadcast
Harvey Beaks made its international debut on Nicktoons in the United Kingdom and Ireland on May 11, 2015. The series premiered on Nickelodeon in Africa on June 1 and on Nickelodeon in Australia and New Zealand on June 6. The Southeast Asian feed of Nickelodeon debuted the show on June 8 in the Philippines and on June 29 in Singapore and Malaysia. The series premiered on YTV in Canada on October 10, 2015 and on September 10, 2016, on the original channel. According to the programming page, In Albania, it airs on the network Çufo and Yle in Finland.

Reception

Harvey Beaks received mostly positive reviews from critics. It has 4 stars out of 5 on Common Sense Media. and a 7.7/10 on BehindtheVoiceActors.

Accolades

Comics
Issue one of the Harvey Beaks comic by Stefan Petrucha was due for release on January 26, 2016. A special comic was available for free at San Diego Comic-Con 2015.

References

External links

 
 C. H. Greenblatt's Blog
 

2010s American animated television series
2015 American television series debuts
2017 American television series endings
2010s Nickelodeon original programming
American children's animated adventure television series
American children's animated comedy television series
American children's animated fantasy television series
English-language television shows
Nicktoons
Television series created by C. H. Greenblatt
Animated television series about birds
Animated television series about children
Animated television series about twins